Conospermum amoenum, commonly known as blue smokebush, is a shrub endemic to Western Australia

It blooms between July and October producing blue-white flowers.

It is found on ironstone hills and uplands in the southern Wheatbelt region of Western Australia where it grows in sandy to sandy clay soils often containing lateritic gravel.

The species was first formally described by the botanist Carl Meisner in 1845 in Johann Georg Christian Lehmann's work, Proteaceae. Plantae Preissianae. Synonyms include Conospermum suaveolensis, Conospermum suaveolente and Conospermum suaveolens.

There are two recognised subspecies:
 Conospermum amoenum subsp. amoenum	 	 	
 Conospermum amoenum subsp. cuneatum

References

External links

Eudicots of Western Australia
amoenum
Endemic flora of Western Australia
Plants described in 1845